Fuglefjorden is a fjord in Albert I Land at Spitsbergen,  Svalbard. The island of Fugløya divides the fjord into two branches. The eastern branch has several islets, skerries and shoals.

References

Fjords of Spitsbergen